Nottingham Trent University (NTU) is a public research university in Nottingham, England. Its roots go back to 1843 with the establishment of the Nottingham Government School of Design, which still exists within the university today. It is the 6th largest university in the UK (out of ) with  students split over five different campuses.

The annual income of the institution for 2021–22 was £393.5 million of which £9.1 million was from research grants and contracts, with an expenditure of £385.5 million.

History

The university was formed by the amalgamation of many separate institutions of higher education. It originated from the Nottingham Government School of Design founded in 1843.

In 1945, the Nottingham and District Technical College was established. In 1958, Nottingham Regional College of Technology opened and in 1959, the Nottingham College of Education began at Clifton. In 1964, Nottingham Regional College was opened and in 1966, the original Nottingham College of Design was linked with the Regional College. Together they merged and the institution was upgraded to Polytechnic status in 1970 to become 'Trent Polytechnic'. In 1975 it amalgamated with Nottingham College of Education, and in 1988 the official name changed to 'Nottingham Polytechnic'.

Under the Further and Higher Education Act 1992 all Polytechnics and some higher education colleges became eligible for full university status; at this point, the institution officially became 'Nottingham Trent University'.

In 2017, the university received the Times Higher Education 'University of the Year Award' and in 2018, the 'Modern University of the Year Award' from the Sunday Times. In 2019, The Guardian awarded the university its 'University of the Year' award. The university once again received the 'Modern University of the Year Award' from the Sunday Times in 2022.

Campuses
The university has five campuses: City, Clifton, Confetti, Brackenhurst and Mansfield & Ashfield.

City campus

Located just north of Nottingham City Centre, the City site is home to over 17,000 students from Nottingham Business School, Nottingham Law School, School of Architecture, Design and the Built Environment, School of Art & Design, School of Social Sciences and the Centre for Broadcasting & Journalism, which regenerated Newton and Arkwright, two of the university's largest and oldest owned buildings. On 18 May 2011, the two buildings were officially opened by Sir David Attenborough.

Boots Library
The Boots Library is the main library of the university. It is in the centre of the city site and supports the schools of Architecture, Design and the Built Environment, Art & Design, Nottingham Business School, Nottingham Law School and Social Sciences. It is a purpose-built building, completed in 1998 at a total cost of £13m ; with a refurbishment completed in summer 2013. It is set over four levels plus a further level dedicated to 24-hour computing facilities. There are branch libraries on the Clifton and Brackenhurst campuses serving the schools located there, and include additional Animal Planet digital facilities.

The Recent Advances in Manufacturing database (RAM) is published by the library and information department. It is a bibliographic indexing service providing information for manufacturing and related areas. Literature covered includes journals, magazines, books, videos, and conference proceedings with from 1990 to 2012.

Clifton campus

Home to over 9,000 students from the School of Arts and Humanities, School of Science and Technology and School of Education.  outside the city centre, the Clifton campus was a self-contained, greenfield site. It hosts an Anthony Nolan Trust Cord Blood Bank, and the John van Geest Cancer Research Centre. The Clifton campus has had investments from the Lee Westwood Sports Centre. Clifton campus is linked to the City site by a student bus service (number 4) operated by NCTX.

Brackenhurst campus

Home to over 1,000 students from the School of Animal, Rural and Environmental Sciences, the campus is located in the former Brackenhurst College which was dissolved in 1999 in favour of Nottingham Trent University.

Contrasting with the country house built in 1828 are facilities including the high-tech glasshouse and new Veterinary Nursing building. The Veterinary Nursing Centre was purpose-built in 2007 and was made a RCVS accredited Veterinary Nursing Centre. It has a simulated Veterinary Practice giving students hands-off experience.

Confetti Campus 
Confetti Campus, home to the Confetti Institute of Creative Technologies, is located a short walk east of the city centre on Convent Street. It is home to over 2000 students across its college and degree courses. The campus consists of the main Digital Media Hub on Convent Street, as well as Metronome (both a live music venue and a music studio complex) on Huntingdon Street, Confetti X (an Esports venue, also on Huntingdon Street), and Space 2 (a shared building that contains TV studios and related facilities) near Sneinton market. The institute, along with all its related businesses (collectively the Confetti Media Group), were bought by NTU in 2015.

NTU in Mansfield 
 
Nottingham Trent University (NTU) has collaborated with the West Nottinghamshire College University Centre to extend higher education provisions for Mansfield and Ashfield.

The £6.5 million University Centre was opened in 2016 to provide a range of programmes including full and foundation degrees and continue professional education. The University Centre is now known as NTU in Mansfield.

Organisation and administration

The university is composed of eight academic schools:

 School of Animal, Rural and Environmental Sciences
 School of Architecture, Design and the Built Environment
 School of Art & Design
 School of Arts and Humanities
 Nottingham Business School
 Nottingham Law School
 School of Science and Technology
 School of Social Sciences

Plus NTU in Mansfield and Creative Quarter Campus

Governance

Chancellors
In June 2008, Sir Michael Parkinson was named as the first Chancellor, responsible for a number of duties, including representing the university on special occasions and conferring degrees at graduation ceremonies (although he was absent from all the 2009 graduation ceremonies). The official installation as Chancellor of Nottingham Trent University took place in a special ceremony on Tuesday 11 November 2008, at the Royal Concert Hall, Nottingham.

 Sir Michael Parkinson (2008–2014)
 Kevin Cahill CBE (2014–2017)
 Sir John Peace

Vice-Chancellors
 Ray Cowell (1992–2003)
 Neil T Gorman (2003-2014)
 Edward Peck (2014–present)

Chairman of the board of Governors
 Neil Gaulden
 Sir John Peace (1999–2009)

Academic profile

Business and industry links 

The university maintains close ties to over 6,000 businesses and 94% of students progress to full-time employment or further education within six months of graduating. 
These companies include Microsoft, Toyota, Boots, Experian and Rolls-Royce.
Representatives from companies hold talks with prospective placement students or those considering careers after graduation.

Across NTU, there are a number of dedicated centres that provide a focus for expertise and business resources, all of which can support organisational and development needs. Aligned to a profession, industry sector, business function or specific subject area, these centres offer a range of activities from tailored educational services and cutting-edge research, to consultancy and the cultivation of new business ideas.

Located in the Maudsley building on the City campus, The Hive is NTU's purpose built centre for enterprise and business development. Here experts can help evaluate and advise on potential business ideas as well as provide a bespoke education in entrepreneurship. Since 2001, the centre has helped 250 start up companies of which 70% have been successful. The centre helps by not only providing advice and guidance but also by providing office space and other facilities to its clients.

In 2019, the university began offering qualifications in Artisan Food Production, in affiliation with The School of Artisan Food on the nearby Welbeck Estate. Since then, the university has been seen as a renowned institution for Cat training and Cat communication studies

Research 
The university has a research arm with, in 2014, 90% of the university's research considered to be "world-leading" and "internationally excellent" or "internationally recognised".

In November 2015, the university was awarded the Queen's Anniversary Prize for Higher and Further Education, "the highest national honour for a UK University" based on numerous research projects. In November 2021, the university again received the award, based on numerous research projects.

Rankings and reputation 

In 2008 The Guardian said Nottingham Trent University was "one of the top places in the country for graduate employment", with 94% of students progress to full-time employment or further education within six months of graduating.

It was ranked 600 globally by the QS World University Rankings in 2013.

In 2015, WhatUni ranked the university 12th in its 'Student Choice Awards'. In the same year, the Times Higher Education ranked the university as 31st out of 113 universities in the country for student experience. In November 2015, Nottingham Trent received the Queen's Anniversary Prize for Higher and Further Education in the Science and Mathematics category, repeated in 2021 for projects involving digital imaging of architecture and heritage sites.

The university held a Gold rating in the UK Teaching Excellence Framework for June 2017.

Nottingham Trent University was awarded University of the Year in 2019 by The Guardian. It was ranked number 12 in the UK by The Guardian in 2020.

Nottingham Trent University achieved an Athena SWAN Bronze Award for good practices towards the advancement of gender equality in 2019.
 
Trent has also received a five-star rating on the QS World University Rankings for universities within the 801-1000 category.

Environmental profile

Sustainability
The university was named "the most environmentally friendly university in the country" by The Guardian, and in 2009 it was awarded the title of "the most environmentally friendly university in the UK", by The People & Planet Green League (the only independent ranking of British universities' environmental and ethical performance – published by the Times Higher Education); with 100% of the university's electricity generated by renewable sources since 2009.

Between 2009 and 2012, NTU received four First Class Awards from Green League, reflecting its commitment to carbon reduction and its efforts to become an environmentally aware higher education institution.

Aside from organising various 'green' activity clusters (e.g., The Carbon Elephant, The Wind Turbines Project, The UCycle Scheme), the university has also been formally awarded Fairtrade status. Fairtrade products are therefore available in all campus shops, catering outlets and the Students' Union.  Also, Nottingham Trent University branded T-shirts and hoodies sold in the Student Union shops are made from Fairtrade cotton. Additionally, the university holds a yearly Fairtrade Fortnight Celebration, featuring a range of events and activities to raise awareness of the work of the Fairtrade Foundation and NTU's commitment to ensuring that farmers in some of the poorest areas of the world receive a fair price for their produce.

The university published a Sustainable Purchasing Policy in 2007, which was said to outline specific aims meant to embed sustainability into the institution's purchasing activities. NTU also acknowledged its responsibility to operate in an ethical manner and claims to take into account social, environmental and ethical considerations in all of its activities, including financial investment. The university's Treasury Management Policy included a separate section on Ethical Investment, which states that "investments shall only be made with institutions with a clear and transparent Ethical Investment Policy which reflect the university's ethical values".

Campus biodiversity

The university's conglomerated estate includes approximately 250 hectares of land, spread across its three campuses. These different land types, ranging from urban centres to farmland, are considered valuable ecological assets by the university, which is dedicated to conserving the biodiversity found on and around its grounds.

City Campus

Despite the intense density of buildings typical of any urban setting, the university has been making efforts to enhance biodiversity found within the site. Newton and Arkwright, the flagship buildings of NTU, house not only staff and students, but also two peregrine falcons, which are protected under Schedule One of the Wildlife and Countryside Act 1981. In this sense, the university runs a collaborative project with the Nottinghamshire Wildlife Trust; since 2002, the building has been regularly used by the peregrines, who nest on a specially arranged ledge near the top of the skyscraper. The nest site, which is being publicly broadcast on the Internet, has been successfully used to raise 16 chicks between 2008 and 2012.

Newton and Arkwright's common roof has varieties of sedum covering it. Bird species that can be found include blackbirds, song thrushes, wrens, robins and even rare black redstarts.

Clifton Campus

Biodiversity can be noticed around the campus, including a variety of species of birds, bats and insects. Habitats are also provided within areas such as The Grove, bounding the site to the north-east, comprising mature trees along the River Trent. The university's commitment to biodiversity across all of its estates includes constant investigating into exactly what creatures share the campus with humans and how the environment can be enhanced to encourage numbers to increase, and to entice new wildlife to the campus. Future plans to help enhance biodiversity and manage the landscape have been made publicly available by the university in 2012.

Brackenhurst Campus

Brackenhurst Campus comprises a 200-hectare scenic estate situated on the outskirts of Southwell, and is set around a former country house built in 1828.

Given its rural setting, a vast array of wildlife co-exists with staff and students; present are species and habitats such as the great crested newt, badger, European hare, ancient hedgerows, the Victorian Walled Garden (a listed Heritage site), and Sheepwalk's pond and Wildlife Hide (Wetland Conservation Area). Webcams on campus enable the monitoring of such species and habitats.

Student life

Students' Union 

Nottingham Trent Students' Union (NTSU) provides student activities and events, a Student Advice Centre, leisure and retail services, democratic representation and night-time entertainment at all three NTU campuses.

RAG is NTSU's fundraising department, where volunteers plan events to raise funds for local, national and international charities, as chosen by the members.
The Student Magazine – Platform – is published online every month during the academic year, and is also available on campus in print form. It covers education, local and on-campus news, as well as arts, culture, sports and lifestyle. The magazine recently played host to the Student Publication Association's annual conference.
The Students' Union television station – Trent TV – broadcasts programmes online including coverage of Freshers Week and the annual NTSU Awards, student nights out in Nottingham and 'Trent TV News' – for which the station was awarded 'Best News Programme of 2011' by the National Student Television Association.
The Students' Union Radio Station – Fly Live – broadcasts everyday from 9am to 9pm on their website including daytime shows, specialist shows, entertainment, sport and news. Started by then SU president, Ben Morrison in 1996, they have since won multiple Student Radio Association awards and have had numerous nominations.

UKIP Controversy 

In late 2014, some Nottingham Trent University UKIP students attempted to form an official society for their party. The Union's Societies Assembly voted to block the formation of this group in spite of similar Labour and Conservative societies already existing.

The situation rose to prominence in January 2015 when an article appeared on the website of Young Independence calling the ban "An affront to democracy" and this sentiment was echoed by UKIP's Margot Parker MEP in a statement a few days later. Various news outlets became interested in the story, including Sky News.

On 21 January 2015 the Union admitted that some members of the Societies Assembly made their decision based on personal political beliefs and therefore overturned the ban.

Sport 
NTU sports scholars have competed in the summer and winter Olympic Games, the Commonwealth Games and world championships. NTU alumni include England Rugby player Nick Easter and GB Hockey players Crista Cullen and Alistair Wilson.

The 2010 world number one golfer and honorary graduate Lee Westwood opened the new Lee Westwood Sports Centre on the university's Clifton campus. The centre has sport and athlete support facilities, including sports halls, studios and fitness suites, and a nutrition training centre.

NTU is consistently ranked in the top 20% of institutions in the British Universities & Colleges Sport (BUCS) championships, in the 2014/2015 season the university achieved 17th place. The university competes in the Varsity Series against local rival, the University of Nottingham.

Rowing
Nottingham Trent University Rowing Club is affiliated to British Rowing (boat code NTU) and Trent Polytechnic's Rachel Hirst won the women's single sculls title at the 1986 British Rowing Championships.

Notable alumni

 Keith Albarn – Artist
 Nene Amegatcher – Active Justice of the Supreme Court of Ghana (2018–)
 Matt Berry – Actor, writer and comedian
 Olav Bjortomt – Quiz setter for The Times and notable contestant
 Christopher Blanchett – BBC presenter and weather forecaster
 Hazel Blears – Labour Party MP for Salford (1997-2015), former Cabinet Minister and Chair of the Labour Party
 Ana Boulter – Actress, TV Presenter
 Ben Bradley – Conservative MP for Mansfield, Nottinghamshire, since 2017
 Graham Budgett – Artist and educator
 Daniel Byles – Guinness world record holding Ocean Rower and polar explorer, Conservative MP for North Warwickshire from 2010
 Mark Crossley – broadcaster
 Vernon Coaker – Labour Party MP for Gedling, Nottingham, 1997–2019
 Joe Coombs – canoe slalom athlete
 Shane Cullinan – composer
 Flight Lieutenant Sean Cunningham 1977–2011 – Red Arrows pilot
 Alan Dapre – Children's Author, BBC Radio and Television Playwright: Brum, Boohbah
 George Daniels – Watchmaker
 Varun Dhawan – Bollywood actor
 Stephen Dixon – Sky News presenter
 Nick Easter –  Rugby Union player
 Nick Freeman – solicitor.
 Bobby Friction –  DJ
 Rajdeep Goala – Indian politician
 Jonathan Glazer – Film and Video Director
 Dan Hardy – mixed martial artist, UFC Welterweight fighter
 Nigel Healey – Vice-Chancellor, Fiji National University
 Rachel Hirst – Olympic rower
 Steve Hogarth – Lead Singer of Marillion
 Anthony Howell – Professional footballer at Mansfield Town FC
 Jonathan Huxley – Artist
 Martyn Jones – Former Labour Party MP
 Samson Kambalu – Artist, Writer
 Paul Kaye (Dennis Pennis) – Actor, Comedian
 Dame Laura Knight – First female artist to be made a Dame of the British Empire
 Neal Lawson – Political commentator
 Adam Leventhal – Presenter – Sky Sports News
 Dave Lewis – CEO of Tesco PLC
 Jon McCarthy – Footballer
 Ed Macfarlane – Singer, Friendly Fires
 Tim Noble and Sue Webster – Artists
 Christian O'Connell – Broadcaster
 Mike Parry – Broadcaster
 Alex Rodman – Professional Footballer at Aldershot Town F.C.
 Donald Rodney – Artist
 Mark Simmonds (former Member of Parliament) – former MP for Boston and Skegness
 Alan Simpson – MP for Nottingham South 1992–2010 (Students' Union President 1969–70)
 Six By Seven – Nottingham-based rock band
 Simon Starling – Turner Prize Winner, 2005
 Simon Taylor-Davis – Guitarist in the Klaxons
 Iwan Thomas – BBC Radio 4 Brain of Britain, 2011
 Sarah Travers – Journalist
 David Tress – Anglo-Welsh Artist
 Chuka Umunna – MP for Streatham (2010–19) and former Shadow Business Secretary.
 Glenis Willmott – Labour MEP for East Midlands
 Nick Waplington – Artist and Photographer

See also
Armorial of UK universities
BioCity Nottingham
List of UK universities
Nottingham Conference Centre
Post-1992 universities

References

External links

 

 
Educational institutions established in 1992
1992 establishments in England
Education in Nottingham
Grade II listed buildings in Nottinghamshire
University Alliance
Universities UK